Cheshmeh Sardeh-ye Olya (also Romanized as Cheshmeh Sardeh-ye ‘Olyā and Cheshmeh Sardeh-e ‘Olyā; also known as Cheshmeh Sardeh) is a village in Honam Rural District, in the Central District of Selseleh County, Lorestan Province, Iran. At the 2006 census, its population was 134, in 32 families.

References 

Towns and villages in Selseleh County